Tania Libertad de Souza Zúñiga (born October 24, 1952) known professionally as Tania Libertad, is a Peruvian-Mexican singer in the World Music genre.

Libertad was named an Ambassador for Peace by UNESCO, Comendadora by the Peruvian government, a member of the Order of Rio Branco by the Brazilian government, among other honors. In 2009, she received the Latin Grammy Lifetime Achievement Award for musical excellence. With more than 44 albums and sales of over 12 million copies, her work is widely known throughout the Americas, Europe and Africa. She has performed concerts in France, Italy, Spain, Portugal, Belgium, Germany, Switzerland, Holland, England, Morocco, Angola, Senegal, the United States, Peru, Ecuador, Puerto Rico, Venezuela, the Dominican Republic, Honduras, Uruguay, Colombia, Costa Rica, Guatemala, Panama, El Salvador, Argentina, Brazil and Mexico. The year 2012 marked 50 years as a performer with two sold-out performances at the Palacio de Bellas Artes in Mexico City, launching a tour throughout Latin America.

Early life

Libertad was born in Zaña, a small town in the Lambayeque Region on the coast of northern Peru and was raised in the regional capital of Chiclayo. Her mother was a nurse of indigenous descent, and her father was a policeman of Portuguese descent with very traditional views on gender roles. She grew up with eight older brothers. She found growing up in such a male-dominated environment difficult.

She first sang on stage at the age of five in Chiclayo. Because her parents worked long hours, her family didn't know she was singing. In early performances, she sang traditional Peruvian and Mexican songs, including waltzes and boleros. When her father discovered her musical talent, he had her sing songs he had written to his mistresses; she found these songs were of poor quality and helped her distinguish between good and bad music. She further developed her repertoire with traditional and rock music on the radio, and recalls singing in competitions at age seven, knowing 300 boleros by eight, and making records by nine.

Career
As a teenager, Libertad moved to the Peruvian capital of Lima. She sang in nightclubs there, and her father worked as her manager. She was soon offered a contract with RCA Victor and had her first national hit in Peru, "La Contamanina." While Libertad pursued her musical career she convinced her father to let her study engineering in the university. Because her father wanted to study what one of her brothers did, she studied science and engineering in fisheries. She never used this education later in life, but she credits her university experience with exposing her to other people who were interested in art and left-wing politics, especially anti-war movements.

During this time, Libertad's interest in Afro-Peruvian music, which flourished in her native north, grew. The nationalist Peruvian government wanted to encourage expressions of Peruvian culture, going so far as to establish an Afro-Peruvian ballet company. She also became uncomfortable singing in nightclubs due to the sexism and racism prevalent there, which motivated her to begin singing socially conscious music in universities and union halls. But as her father became more protective of her as a teenager, he wanted her to give up her musical career, so at the age of 20, she ran away from home and lived with friends for two weeks until her father accepted her desire to sing full-time.

In 1976, Libertad began to travel abroad, and was inspired by the musical traditions and political consciousness she encountered in the places she visited, such as Cuba. Unsuccessful in Peru with her new brand of music, she decided to emigrate to Mexico. She arrived there penniless and bonded with Latin American artists who fled their home countries for political reasons. Soon, she found her first job at the Blanquita Theatre in Mexico City. There, Libertad was given a contract by PolyGram singing trova, Afro-Peruvian music, salsa, and bolero. In 1985, she released her first album of boleros. She has lived in Mexico since, and has sung in over 20 countries on every inhabited continent. 

During her career, Libertad shared the stage with other international artists such as Mercedes Sosa, Joan Manuel Serrat, Silvio Rodríguez, Pablo Milanés, Alberto Cortez, León Gieco, Juan Carlos Baglietto, Guadalupe Pineda, Chico Buarque, Gal Costa, Alfredo Zitarrosa, Cesária Évora, Vicente Fernández, Eugenia León, Juan Gabriel, Miguel Bosé, Plácido Domingo, Armando Manzanero, Simón Díaz, Willie Colón, Tito Puente, Oscar Chávez, Iván Lins, Ricardo Cocciante, Soledad Pastorutti, Marco Antonio Muñiz, Soledad Bravo,  Amália Rodrigues, Susana Rinaldi, Phil Manzanera, Lucha Villa and the group Inti Illimani, among others.

The Nobel Prize winning Portuguese author Jose Saramago writes of her work:

"The first time I heard Tania Libertad sing, it was a revelation from on high - from a place where only a naked voice might go, alone in the world, unaccompanied by any instrument. Tania was singing the Rafael Alberti composition "La Paloma" a capella, and each note touched a string in my soul until I was completely dazzled." - José Saramago

Influences
Despite not being of African descent, Libertad is inspired by the Afro-Peruvian music indigenous to the area of Peru in which she was born, an area primarily populated by descendants of African slaves. Her albums Costa Negra and Color Negro, from 2003 and 2004 respectively, are recordings of Afro-Peruvian songs.

Her appreciation of Afro-Antillan music has been reflected on works which reference Trova and Nueva canción, and have included arranged renditions to compositions by Silvio Rodriguez.

Additionally, she has collaborated with Armando Manzanero.

Personal life
Libertad is married to a businessman and has a son; they live in Mexico City.

She considers herself a citizen of the world, and ascribes to the ideas of Simón Bolívar, especially that Latin America should be a unified body without borders. She identifies as anti-war, but does not like to be labeled a protest singer.

Discography
Libertad has recorded 44 albums with more than 12 million copies sold.

Tania Libertad
Soy Peruana
La Contamanina
Mejor que nunca
La dulce voz de Tania Libertad
El mismo Puerto
Concierto en la voz de Tania Libertad
Hits
Hits Vol. II
Alfonsina y el mar
Lo inolvidable de Chabuca Granda
Como una campana de cristal
Boleros
Nuevamente Boleros
Me voy pa'la pachanga
Trovadicción
Mucho corazón
Razón de Vivir (duet with Djavan)
Tania canta a José Alfredo Jiménez (duet with Vicente Fernandez)
Boleros hoy (duet Armando Manzanero, Miguel Bose, Ivan Lins and Azucar Moreno)
México Lindo y Querido
África en América
La Libertad de Manzanero
Amar Amando
Tania y su sabrosa Libertad
Himno al amor
Mujeres apasionadas
Tomate esta botella conmigo
Armando la Libertad
Blue Note, Live in New York
La vida, ese paréntesis (duet with Joan Manuel Serrat and Willie Colon)
Arias de Ópera, ¿Y... por que no?
Alfonsina Y El Mar XX Años
Costa Negra
20 De Colección
Negro Color
Tania 50 años de Libertad
Manzanero a Tres Pistas
Desarmando a Tania
Por Ti y Por Mi
Las Tres Grandes: Primera Fila with Guadalupe Pineda and Eugenia León
Jose Alfredo y Yo

References

External links

1952 births
Living people
20th-century Mexican women singers
Mexican people of indigenous peoples descent
Peruvian people of Portuguese descent
People from Lambayeque Region
Peruvian emigrants to Mexico
Naturalized citizens of Mexico
20th-century Peruvian women singers
20th-century Peruvian singers
Peruvian people of indigenous peoples descent
Singers from Mexico City
Latin Grammy Lifetime Achievement Award winners
People from Chiclayo
21st-century Mexican women singers
Women in Latin music